Nurettin Korkmaz (born 27 February 2002) is a Turkish professional footballer who plays as a winger for the Turkish club Kayserispor in the Süper Lig.

Professional career
On 23 February 2019, Korkmaz signed a 2.5 year contract with his youth club Kayserispor. Korkmaz made his professional debut for Kayserispor in a 2-2 Süper Lig away game against Akhisarspor on 19 May 2019.
He made his Turkey U18 debut against Lithuania U18.

References

External links
 
 
 

2002 births
People from Kocasinan
Living people
Turkish footballers
Turkey youth international footballers
Association football midfielders
Kayserispor footballers
C.D. Trofense players
Süper Lig players
Liga Portugal 2 players
Turkish expatriate footballers
Expatriate footballers in Portugal
Turkish expatriate sportspeople in Portugal